Major-General Lord George William Russell  (8 May 1790 – 16 July 1846) was a British soldier, politician and diplomat. He was the second son of the 6th Duke of Bedford and brother to John Russell, the Whig and Liberal Prime Minister. His children were Blanche Russell, Francis Russell, 9th Duke of Bedford, Arthur Russell the Whig and Liberal MP for Tavistock and Odo Russell, the British diplomat and first British Ambassador to the German Empire.

Life
Upon gaining the rank of Lieutenant in the 1st Dragoon Guards, Russell was appointed aide-de-camp (ADC) to Sir George Ludlow on his Copenhagen Expedition in 1807. During the Peninsular War he fought in the Battle of Talavera on 27 July 1809 where he was wounded. He was then ADC to General Thomas Graham in 1810 and fought at the Battle of Barossa in 1811. He was ADC to Viscount Wellington (later the Duke of Wellington) in 1812 and again in 1817, when the Duke was Ambassador in Paris.

The second son of John Russell, 6th Duke of Bedford and brother of Prime Minister of the United Kingdom Lord John Russell, he sat as Member of Parliament (MP) for Bedford from 1812 until 1830. He was invested as a Companion, Order of the Bath (CB) in 1831. He held the office of Minister to Lisbon in August 1833, the office of Minister to Württemberg in November 1833 and the office of Ambassador to Berlin in 1835. He was invested as a Knight Grand Cross, Order of the Bath (GCB) in 1838 and gained the rank of major-general in November 1841.

Russell married Elizabeth Anne Rawdon, granddaughter of Elizabeth Rawdon, Countess of Moira.  The couple were the parents of Blanche Russell, Francis Russell, 9th Duke of Bedford, Lord Arthur John Edward Russell and Odo Russell, 1st Baron Ampthill.

References

Bibliography
Lloyd, E. M. & Seccombe, T. "Russell, Lord George William (1790–1846)", rev. James Falkner, Oxford Dictionary of National Biography, Oxford University Press, 2004 , (Retrieved 28 Feb 2006) (subscription required)

External links 

 

1790 births
1846 deaths
Ambassadors of the United Kingdom to Prussia
British Army generals
British Army personnel of the Peninsular War
Knights Grand Cross of the Order of the Bath
G
Members of the Parliament of the United Kingdom for English constituencies
UK MPs 1812–1818
UK MPs 1818–1820
UK MPs 1820–1826
UK MPs 1826–1830
Younger sons of dukes